All 40 seats in the Senate of Virginia were up for election on November 3, 1987, alongside the Virginia House of Delegates election.

Overall results

Results by district

See also 
 United States elections, 1987
 Virginia elections, 1987
 Virginia House of Delegates election, 1987

References

Virginia
1987 Virginia elections
Virginia Senate elections